Falmouth may refer to:

Places

Antigua 
Falmouth, Antigua and Barbuda
Falmouth Harbour, Antigua

Australia
Falmouth, Tasmania, a locality in North-east Tasmania

Canada
Falmouth, Nova Scotia, a community in Hants County
Upper Falmouth, Nova Scotia

Jamaica 
Falmouth, Jamaica, the capital of Trelawny Parish

United Kingdom
Falmouth, Cornwall, the original Falmouth from which most of the others are named
Falmouth Docks railway station
Falmouth Town railway station

United States
Falmouth, Florida
Falmouth, Indiana
Falmouth, Kentucky
Falmouth, Maine, a New England town
Falmouth (CDP), Maine, a village in the town
Falmouth, Massachusetts, a New England town
Falmouth (CDP), Massachusetts, a village in the town
Falmouth, Michigan
Falmouth, Pennsylvania
Falmouth, Virginia

Ships
HMS Falmouth, several ships of the British Royal Navy
USS Falmouth (1827), a United States navy sloop-of-war in commission from 1828 to 1859
  one of several ships of that name

Other
Falmouth Spring, a first-magnitude spring in Suwannee County, Florida